Breitenbrunn is a municipality in the district of Neumarkt in Bavaria in Germany.

Mayors
 since 2014: Johann Lanzhammer (FW)
 2008-2014: Josef Kellermeier (CSU)
 1984-2008: Josef Köstler

Notable people
 The Bavarian war minister Anton Joseph Freiherr von Gumppenberg (1787-1855) was born in Breitenbrunn.

References

Neumarkt (district)
Bavarian Circle